The Russell 2500 Index measures the performance of the 2,500 smallest companies (19% of total capitalization) in the Russell 3000 Index, with a weighted average market capitalization of approximately $4.3 billion, median capitalization of $1.2 billion and market capitalization of the largest company of $18.7 billion.

The index, which was launched on June 1, 1990, is maintained by FTSE Russell, a subsidiary of the London Stock Exchange Group. Its ticker symbol is ^R25I.

Top 10 holdings
Huntington Bancshares
Hologic
Mid-America Apartments
Quintiles IMS Holdings
Alaska Air Group
Idexx Laboratories
Snap-on
Arch Capital Group
Lear Corporation
E-Trade Financial
(as of December 31, 2016)

Top sectors by weight
Financial Services
Producer Durables
Consumer Discretionary
Technology
Health Care

See also
Russell Investments
Russell 2000 Index
Russell 1000 Index

References

External links
Russell page for Russell 2500 index
Russell Indexes
Russell Investment Group
Index Construction and Methodology
Yahoo! Finance page for ^R25I

American stock market indices